Mongolia and Turkey have respective embassies in each other's capitals.

History

The Mongols and Turks have developed a strong relationship. Both peoples were commonly nomadic peoples despite ethnic differences, and the cultural sprachbund evolved into a mixture of alliance and conflicts. The Xiongnu people were thought to be the ancestors of modern Mongols and Turks. Both Turks and Mongols view themselves nomadic warriors, and, for a long time, developed a history of fostering alliance against various Chinese Empires in its attempts to preserve its culture and border.

The two peoples also shared a common Turko-Mongol tradition, which gradually developed into the common sense of reverence to Tengrism, with a strong pride based on freedom and honors (however, there are also well documented barbarity and destruction under the Mongol Empire in both Asia and Europe). The belief managed to survive even when the Mongols and Turks adopted other religions, Buddhism and Islam, respectively.

When Genghis Khan established the Mongol Empire, the Turks were split between alliance and hostility. A number of Turkic tribes allied with the Mongol Empire, owning by cultural commonalities; while a number of Turkic tribes rose up and fought against the Mongol rulers, continuing the nomadic traditions. This had continued with various Turko-Mongol governments like Golden Horde, Timurid Empire, the Mughal Empire until the rise of Ottoman Empire, in yet another product of a Turko-Mongol dynasty.

Today, many Turkic peoples continue to share nearly identical cultural customs with their Mongolic counterparts, the result that was traced from history. According from V. Gordlevsky, and retrieved by Russian Turkologist and Mongologist Aleksandr Kadyrbaev "In order to understand the history of Turkic peoples it is necessary to study the Mongols".

Modern relations
Turkey and Mongolia established relations in 1969 when Mongolia was a communist state. The friendly relationship between two countries was reflected in a ceremony back in 2019, when Turkish ambassador to Mongolia Ahmet Yazal declared "We have historical, cultural and social relations that date back to 2000 years ago. We can do many things to ensure that this friendship will take us further", adding that Turkey will always be a third neighbor of Mongolia.

Also, Turkey and Mongolia have deepened their cooperation, ranged from education to economic assistance, as well as historical commitment to understand the ancient relations of the two nations.

References

External links
Genetic affinities among Mongol ethnic groups and their relationship to Turks
Embassy of Mongolia in Ankara
Embassy of Turkey in Ulaanbaatar

 
Turkey
Mongolia